Ann Nischke (born January 19, 1951) is an American Republican politician from Wisconsin.

Born in Milwaukee, Wisconsin, Nischke graduated from University of Wisconsin–Eau Claire in 1977. Nischke was elected to the Wisconsin State Assembly and served until 2007.

Notes

Politicians from Milwaukee
University of Wisconsin–Eau Claire alumni
Members of the Wisconsin State Assembly
Women state legislators in Wisconsin
1951 births
Living people
21st-century American politicians
21st-century American women politicians